Rajkumar Urmaliya is a former Member of Legislative Assembly from  Sirmour Constituency in Rewa District (Vindhya Region) in the Indian state of Madhya Pradesh from 2008 to 2013.

Education 
He graduated in 1988 from Awdesh Pratap Singh University Rewa.

Politician 
He started his political Journey in 2003 when he sought the nomination in the Vidhansabha Election from Sirmour (Vidhan Sabha constituency) from Bahujan Samaj Party. He was defeated by RamLakhan Sharma (MCP) by a margin of 208 votes.

He won his second election in 2008 against the powerful political personality Shri Nivas Tiwari (Indian National Congress) and represented Sirmour Constituency from 2008 to 2013 in Madhya Pradesh Vidhanabha.

He was defeated in 2013 by Yuvraj DivyaRaj Singh Bhartiya Janata Party.

Judgements 

Shriniwas Tiwari vs Rajkumar Urmalia on 3 May 2013
Judgement : Madhya Pradesh High Court.

References

Sources 

Nomination materials

Bahujan Samaj Party politicians from Madhya Pradesh
Living people
Madhya Pradesh MLAs 2008–2013
People from Rewa district
Year of birth missing (living people)